Arlene Singer (born October 10, 1948) is an American politician, attorney, and judge of the Ohio Sixth District Court of Appeals. She is a former Judge of the Toledo Municipal Court and served as a member of the Ohio House of Representatives.

Public Service

Elected Positions 
Judge, Ohio Sixth District Court of Appeals. Elected 2002, re-elected 2008 and 2014. Presiding Judge, Ohio Sixth District Court of Appeals. 2005 and 2006; 2012 and 2013.

Judge, Toledo Municipal Court. Appointed in January, 1991 by then-Governor Dick Celeste, and elected to the unexpired term in November, 1991. Re-elected to full term, November, 1995 and November, 2001. Presiding and Administrative Judge, Toledo Municipal Court. 2000 and 2001.

Member, Ohio House of Representatives, 117th General Assembly. Represented the 48th District, 1987 and 1988.

Legal Community Leadership 
 Establishing Founder, Toledo Women Lawyers History Project at the University of Toledo College of Law. 
Ohio Supreme Court, Board of Commissioners on Grievances and Discipline. Member, 2003 through 2011. Elected Vice-Chair for 2007, Elected Chair for 2008.
 Ohio Supreme Court, Task Force on the Code of Judicial Conduct. Member, 2007 and 2008. 
 Toledo Bar Association, Board of Trustees. Elected 2000 and re-elected in 2003.

Public Service Recognition Awards 
 YWCA of Northwest Ohio, Milestone Tribute for Contribution in Government (2015)
 Toledo Women's Bar Association, Arabella Babb Mansfield Award (year) 
 Toledo Bar Association, Robert A. Kelb Distinguished Service Award (2016)
 Toledo Junior Bar Association, Order of the Heel (year)

Mentoring 
 Ohio Supreme Court Lawyer to Lawyer Mentoring Program, 2006 to present
 Ohio Judicial College, Mentor Training
 University of Toledo, College of Law, Mentor
 Toledo Women's Bar Association, Mentor

External links
Court News, Judicial Profile, Sixth District Court of Appeals Judge Arlene Singer: http://www.ohiochannel.org/video/court-news-judicial-profile-sixth-district-court-of-appeals-judge-arlene-singer
Toledo Women Lawyers History Project: https://www.toledoblade.com/local/2014/10/03/Project-praises-trail-blazing-female-lawyers-from-area/stories/20141002214?abnpageversion=evoke

References

Members of the Ohio House of Representatives
Women state legislators in Ohio
Living people
1948 births
American women judges
21st-century American women